John Renwick (May 13, 1921 – January 8, 2009) was an American field hockey player. He competed in the men's tournament at the 1948 Summer Olympics.

References

External links
 

1921 births
2009 deaths
American male field hockey players
Olympic field hockey players of the United States
Field hockey players at the 1948 Summer Olympics
Sportspeople from New York City
United States Army personnel of World War II